Alandur is a zone of Chennai corporation, and an urban node in Chennai district, Tamil Nadu, India.

Alandur may also refer to:
 Alandur (state assembly constituency)
 Alandur (Chennai Metro), a metro station
 Alandur taluk